Paul Musamali (born 20 October 1994) is a Ugandan international footballer who plays as a left back for Buildcon F.C in the Zambian Premier League and  for the Uganda national team.

Club career

SC Villa 
Musamali  joined  SC Villa in 2012.  Made his debut against Express FC and scored his first goal for SC Villa against Ndejje University FC  in the Uganda Cup.

Western Stima
He joined Western Stima in 2014, making his debut against Nakumatt FC and scored his first goal against Kakamega Homeboyz

K.C.C.A 
In 2016, Musamali  joined Kampala City Council making his debut against Vipers and scoring his first goal for Kampala City Council against Onduparaka.

Buildcon F.C.
Musamali  joined Buildcon F.C on a two-year contract. He made his debut against Kabwe Warriors.

International career
Musamali  made his debut for the Uganda national team on  14 July 2017 against South Sudan Chan 2018 qualifiers.

Honours
Kampala University FC
University Football League (UFL) : 1 2013,Kampala Capital City Authority FCUgandan Super League: 12017Uganda Cup: 22017, 2018

Personal honorsKampala University FCBest player UFL :2013 Kampala Capital City Authority FC'''
Most Displined Player : 2017

References

External links
 

1994 births
Living people
Ugandan footballers
Uganda international footballers
Kampala Capital City Authority FC players
Association football defenders
Buildcon F.C. players
People from Mbale District